Wutai Township (Rukai language: Vedai) is a mountain indigenous township in Pingtung County, Taiwan.

History

Demographics
The township is mainly inhabited by the Rukai people.

Administrative divisions
The township comprises six villages: Ali, Dawu, Haocha, Jiamu, Jilou and Wutai.

Tourist attractions
 Guchuan Bridge
 Kucapungane, an ancient Rukai village with houses built of shale slabs

References

External links

 Wutai Government website

Taiwan placenames originating from Formosan languages
Townships in Pingtung County